Ministry of Defence Woodbridge or MoD Woodbridge is a military installation located near the town of Woodbridge, in Suffolk, England. The site opened in 2006 and is operated by the British Army and incorporates both Rock Barracks and Woodbridge Airfield. The barracks are home to two Royal Engineers Regiments. The airfield is used periodically by helicopters of the Army Air Corps for training exercises.

The site was previously known as RAF Woodbridge and had periods where it was operated by the Royal Air Force and United States Air Force. The RAF station closed in August 1993.

History

RAF Woodbridge 
Constructed in 1943 as a Royal Air Force (RAF) airfield during the Second World War to assist damaged aircraft to land on their return from raids over Germany, it was later used by the United States Air Force during the Cold War, being the primary home for the 79th Tactical Fighter Squadron and the 78th Tactical Fighter Squadron and squadrons of the 81st Fighter Wing under various designations until 1993.  For many years, the 81st Fighter Wing also operated from nearby RAF Bentwaters, with Bentwaters and Woodbridge being known as the "Twin Bases". The RAF station closed in August 1993.

Reactivation 
In 2001, the Ministry of Defence announced that £100 million would be invested in the Woodbridge site in order to accommodate British Army personnel. Due to budgetary constraints and commitments to Operation Telic (the UK's contribution to the Iraq War), the start of work at Woodbridge was delayed until January 2004.

On 1 September 2006, the former Woodbridge site was split up and the two parts renamed as Woodbridge Airfield and Rock Barracks.

Around 500 army personnel are based at Woodbridge.

Airfield 
Woodbridge Airfield is used by Army Air Corps helicopters for training exercises.  During August 2016, the airfield was used for testing the Airbus A400M Atlas.

Planned closure
In November 2016, the Ministry of Defence announced that MOD Woodbridge would close by 2027. However, in February 2019, following detailed assessment work, the Ministry of Defence concluded the retention of MOD Woodbridge supports the military requirement of the Army, and its closure was cancelled.

Based units 
The following units are based at Rock Barracks.

23 Parachute Engineer Regiment, Royal Engineers
12 Parachute Headquarters and Support Squadron
9 Parachute Squadron
 51 Parachute Squadron
  28 Engineer Regiment (C-CBRN), Royal Engineers
 42 Field Squadron (C-CBRN)
 77 Field Squadron (C-CBRN)

References 

Military installations in England
Military history of Suffolk